West Dante is an unincorporated community in Dickenson County, Virginia, in the United States.

History
A post office was established at West Dante in 1936, and remained in operation until it was discontinued in 1947. West Dante lies west of Dante, hence the name.

References

Unincorporated communities in Dickenson County, Virginia
Unincorporated communities in Virginia